Kamareh-ye Mishnan (also Romanized as Kamareh-ye Mīshnān; also known as Kamareh, Mīshnān, and Tang-e Hāleh) is a village in Gol Gol Rural District, in the Central District of Kuhdasht County, Lorestan Province, Iran. At the 2006 census, its population was 396, in 88 families.

References 

Towns and villages in Kuhdasht County